The Nigerian Military School Zaria, popularly known as (NMS), founded as the Boys-Company of Nigeria in 1954, was established under the auspices of Nigerian Regiment Training centre of the Royal West African Frontier Force (RWAFF). The school was established along with three others in the British Colonial West Africa in Gambia, Gold Coast (now Ghana), and Sierra Leone. It was modeled after the Boys Wing of the British Army. The present day Military School came into being on May 20, 1954. The Nigerian Military School (NMS) had a student battalion that consisted of 4 company in its early years: Alpha Company, Bravo Company, Charlie Company, & Delta Company. Three additional companies were added: Echo Company, Foxtrot Company, and Golf Company. The Boys Company as it used to be called was established as a full-fledged training institution under the regimentation and administration of the defunct Nigerian Regimental Training Centre (NRTC) now Depot NA.

History
The aim of the school was the production of "middle and skilled manpower" to replace the departing British Colonial NCOs. Thus, a lot of emphasis was laid on military and academic training. In 1958, ten Boys from the School sat for the overseas Armed Forces General Certificate Examination and the school changed to school certificate status.

In 1960, the name "Boys Company" was changed to Nigerian Military School. In 1965 the first set of Boys took the West African Examination Council (WAEC) examination in which they performed creditably well.  With the introduction of the new National Policy on Education, the School now runs six-year training programme broken into junior and senior classes of three years duration respectively. A Board of Governors was established to oversee the running of the school.

To facilitate effective administration, Military and Academic training, the school is segmented into 5 main Wings: The Headquarters, Military wing, Education Wing, Boys Battalion and the Administrative Company. The first Commandant of the School, then known as Boys Company, was Captain Wellington Duke Bassey.

Education
The Nigerian Military School gives its students both academic and military training. Every boy soldier as the students are called has one day a week dedicated strictly to military training while the other four days of the week are dedicated to academic training. Similar to other secondary schools, the students sit for the West African Senior School Certificate Exam prior to graduation. The students also have the privilege to earn a commission into the Nigerian Army as private soldiers on the successful completion of their training and graduation from the secondary school.

The initial group of students was known as the "First Platoon" who were sons and wards of serving military personnel. However its military  history can be traced to 1951 when the idea of establishing "Boys Company" along the same pattern of the Boys Wing of British Army was conceived for each of the West African Colonies Namely: the Gambia, Gold coast(Ghana), Nigeria and Sierra Leone. The Nigerian military school prides itself due to its numerous successes in regional and national quizzes, drama and sporting competition. It is also said to have one of the highest educational and academic standards in the country, more than most conventional civil high schools in Nigeria.

Notable alumni

NMS has produced numerous Senior Military officers and Senior Staff in both Government and Private sectors.  till date it has produced a military vice president, four chiefs of defence staff and a president of the united nations general assembly. Some of  its alumni include
Tunde Idiagbon
Joseph Garba
John Shagaya
Jeremiah Useni
John Inienger
Salihu Ibrahim
Buba Marwa
Yakubu Mu'azu
Alexander Ogomudia
Abubakar Sani Bello
Abdulkareem Adisa
 Senator David Mark
 George Alily
Raji Rasaki
Akolisa Ufodike
Abdussamad Dasuki
Zamani Lekwot
Abayomi Olonisakin

Houses
To encourage sporting activities and competition as attendance increased, four houses were created: Exham, Inglis, FairBanks and Swynnerton. These names were later changed to Giffard, Tranchard, Whistler and Lugard.

As the School changed to School certificate status shortly after independence, the house names were also changed to Lagos, Ibadan, Enugu and Kaduna. The new names were chosen to reflect the regional capitals of the country.

In 1976, two additional houses were added and the names were again changed. The new house names reflected military company designations: Alpha, Bravo, Charlie, Delta, Echo, Foxtrot.

One additional has been added: Gulf, the 7th company. In late 2003, the School changed to the old names of Kaduna, Lagos, Ibadan and Enugu, with Abuja, Calabar and Zaria given to the additional new companies of Echo, Foxtrot and Gulf.

Commandants
Since its inception, the Military Institution has at various times been commanded by
numerous Officers. They are as follows:

References

External links
 https://www.exboys.co.uk   /Official Website of Ex Boys of Nigerian Military School, Zaria in the UK]
 https://www.nms1954.sch.ng   /Official website of the Nigerian Military School
 https://www.nmsexboys.com   /Home of Ex-Boys of the Nigerian Military School, Zaria]
 https://t.me/joinchat/MCU-bXHkJhAzZDVk   /Parents Instructors' Association (PIA)
 https://www.youtube.com/watch?v=Zp0u0z6Zlh4&t=227s /clps
 https://www.youtube.com/watch?v=MLFg3Vlh4bE  /clips

Educational institutions established in 1954
Military schools in Nigeria
1954 establishments in Nigeria